Ted is the second studio album from Swedish singer/songwriter Ted Gärdestad, released in 1973 through Polar Music. It contains the hits "Jag Ska Fånga En Ängel", "Sol, Vind Och Vatten", "Come Give Me Love" as well as his 1973 Melodifestivalen entry "Oh Vilken Härlig Da'". The album was produced by Benny Andersson, Björn Ulvaeus and Ted, engineered by Michael B. Tretow and features backing vocals by Agnetha Fältskog and Anni-Frid Lyngstad. The CD version of the album was released in 1991.

An English-language version of the track "Jag Ska Fånga En Ängel" entitled "Gonna Make You My Angel" was released as a single in 1974. The album charted on the Swedish Albums Chart and peaked at number seven in week 26 of 2020. In 2021, it reached a new peak of number six.

Track listing
All lyrics written by Kenneth Gärdestad, music by Ted Gärdestad

Side A:
"Jag ska fånga en ängel" – 3:50
"Sol, vind och vatten" – 3:10
"Skolsång" – 3:02  
"Kaliforniens guld" – 2:37  
"Come Give Me Love" – 3:32
"Ramanagaram" – 2:50

Side B:  
"Oh, vilken härlig da'" – 3:21
"Kom i min fantasi" – 2:34  
"Universum" – 3:52  
"Gitarren och jag" – 3:52  
"Stenansiktet" – 4:45
 From the Jan Halldoff's movie by the same name

Personnel

Musicians
 Ted Gärdestad – lead vocals, acoustic guitar, piano
 Benny Andersson – piano, cembalo, vibraphone, Moog synthesizer, backing vocals
 Björn Ulvaeus – acoustic guitar, banjo, mandolin, backing vocals
 Janne Schaffer – electric guitar
 Mike Watson – bass guitar
 Ola Brunkert – drums
 Roger Palm – drums
 Rutger Gunnarsson – banjo
 Agnetha Fältskog – backing vocals
 Anni-Frid Lyngstad – backing vocals
 Lena Andersson – backing vocals 
 Luciano Mosetti – harmonica

Production
 Benny Andersson – producer
 Björn Ulvaeus – producer
 Ted Gärdestad – producer
 Michael B. Tretow – sound engineer
 Rune Persson – sound engineer
 Åke Elmsäter – sound engineer
 Sven-Olof Walldoff – string arrangements "Universum" and "Kaliforniens Guld"
 Lasse Samuelsson – brass arrangement
 Recorded at Metronome Studios, Stockholm
 Originally released as Polar POLS 241, 1973

Charts

Weekly charts

Year-end charts

References

External links
Official home page, The Ted Gärdestad Society

1973 albums
Ted Gärdestad albums
Swedish-language albums